K-series engine may refer to:
Rover K-series engine
Honda K engine
Mazda K engine
Toyota K engine
Chrysler 2.2 & 2.5 engine, sometimes referred to as the Chrysler K engine, after the Chrysler K platform